Takazumi Katayama (片山敬済, born April 16, 1951) is a Japanese former Grand Prix motorcycle road racing world champion.

Motorcycle racing career
Born in Kobe, Japan, he was the first Japanese rider to win a motorcycle road racing world championship when he claimed the 1977 350cc world championship aboard a Yamaha. In 1979 he accepted an offer from Honda to develop their exotic oval-cylinder, four-stroke NR500 race bike. After retiring from competition, Katayama became a motorcycle Grand Prix racing team owner.

Career statistics

Grand Prix motorcycle racing

Races by year
(key) (Races in bold indicate pole position) (Races in italics indicate fastest lap)

References

Japanese people of Korean descent
Sportspeople from Kobe
Japanese motorcycle racers
250cc World Championship riders
350cc World Championship riders
500cc World Championship riders
Isle of Man TT riders
Motorcycle racing team owners
1951 births
Living people
350cc World Riders' Champions